is a Japanese football player. She plays for the NTV Tokyo Verdy Beleza in the Japanese WE League. and the Japan national team.

Club career
Doko was born in Toda on May 3, 1996. In 2012, when she was 15 years old, she joined L.League club Nippon TV Beleza from youth team. She played many matches as center back from first season. The club also won the champions for 3 years in a row (2015-2017).

National team career
In August 2012, when Doko was 16 years old, she was selected Japan U-20 national team for 2012 U-20 Women's World Cup was held in Japan. At this tournament, she played as center back in all 6 matches and Japan won the 3rd place.

On July 29, 2018, Doko debuted for Japan national team as substitute center back from the 68th minute instead Aimi Kunitake for injury against Brazil.

National team statistics

References

External links

Japan Football Association
Nippon TV Beleza

1996 births
Living people
Association football people from Saitama Prefecture
Japanese women's footballers
Japan women's international footballers
Nadeshiko League players
Nippon TV Tokyo Verdy Beleza players
Women's association football defenders